Gem is the second extended play by American indie pop artist Breanne Düren, released digitally on September 18, 2015, through DürenDüren Records, after a successful Indiegogo campaign for the EP.

Track listing

Personnel 
Credits for Gem adapted from back of CD Case

 Ian Allison – Bass on tracks 2 and 5
 Jim Anton – Bass on tracks 3 and 4
 Steve Goold – Drums on tracks 3 and 4
 Zach Miller – Drums on tracks 2 and 5
 Jasper Nephew – Guitar on all tracks
 Tara Marie Quadrel – additional vocals on track 1
 Whim Photography – artwork
 Zach McNair – art direction and design
 Evan Bakke – tracking engineer
 Rob Osterlin – tracking engineer
 Mark Heimermann – production, recording, and mixing
 Bob Boyd – mastering

References

2015 EPs